The Cock is a Grade II listed pub at 23 High Street, Broom, Bedfordshire SG18 9NA.

It is on the Campaign for Real Ale's National Inventory of Historic Pub Interiors.

It was built in the mid-19th century.

Unusually complete C19 pub interior of pine fittings including dado panelled skittles room with original leather and wood skittles set in the form of a chair, front parlour panelled with built in settles and cupboards, rear parlour with wooden mantelpiece, cambered wooden cupboard, panelling and built in settles, panelled corridor with wooden doors and tiled floors throughout. A rare and unusually complete rural pub interior of this date.

References

Pubs in Bedfordshire
Grade II listed pubs in Bedfordshire
National Inventory Pubs